Expose is the ninth studio album by Japanese singer Shizuka Kudo. It was released on September 7, 1994, through Pony Canyon. The album was recorded and mastered in Los Angeles. Expose is Kudo's first self-produced album. It yielded the two singles, "Blue Rose" and "Jaguar Line".

Critical reception
Kudo was praised for her "headstrong" approach to the new "hard" sound of the album. CDJournal critics positively noted Kudo's "exhilarated" vocal performance, describing it as a mix between a traditionally Japanese singing technique and a more Western influenced one. She received acclaim for tackling the "tightrope act of balancing these two opposite styles".

Commercial performance
Expose debuted at number five on the Oricon Albums Chart, with 53,000 units sold in its first week. The album dropped eight positions to number thirteen on its second week, with 29,000 copies sold. It charted in the top 100 for eight consecutive weeks, selling a reported total of 124,000 copies during its run.

Track listing

Charts

Certification

Release history

References

1994 albums
Shizuka Kudo albums
Pony Canyon albums